Zimmerman Library is the historic main library of the University of New Mexico, located near the center of the university campus in Albuquerque, New Mexico. It is one of the largest and most notable buildings designed by New Mexico architect John Gaw Meem and is the centerpiece of the UNM Libraries, the largest library system in New Mexico with almost 4 million print volumes. It was built in 1936–38 with funding from the Public Works Administration and Works Progress Administration, with further additions completed in 1966 and 1973. The building was named for former university president James Fulton Zimmerman in 1961. It was added to the New Mexico State Register of Cultural Properties and the National Register of Historic Places in 2016.

The library is a nine-story, Pueblo Revival style building constructed from reinforced concrete, brick, and structural clay tile. The original 1938 section of the library consists of a great hall, five reading rooms, and the central nine-story stack tower, which was designed to hold 225,000 volumes. The interior trim and furnishings were handmade by local artisans employed by the WPA, including hand-carved corbels, vigas, and heating register covers, wrought-iron banisters, door handles, and gates, and punched-tin light fixtures. Four murals in the great hall were created by Kenneth Miller Adams.

References

Libraries on the National Register of Historic Places in New Mexico
National Register of Historic Places in Albuquerque, New Mexico
Buildings and structures in Albuquerque, New Mexico
New Mexico State Register of Cultural Properties
University of New Mexico
University and college academic libraries in the United States
University and college buildings completed in 1938